Bringing Back the Sunshine is the ninth studio album by American country music singer Blake Shelton. The album was released on September 30, 2014, by Warner Bros. Nashville. The album was produced by Shelton's longtime producer Scott Hendricks. "Neon Light," the album's lead-off single, was released on August 18, 2014.

Commercial performance
Bringing Back the Sunshine debuted at No. 1 on Billboard's all genre Top 200 and Top Country Albums charts with a first week sales total of 101,000 copies in the United States. The album was certified Gold by the RIAA on January 7, 2015, and Platinum on October 7, 2016.

In Canada, the album debuted at No. 4 on the Canadian Albums Chart, selling 7,700 copies in its first week.

Track listing

Personnel

 Tom Bukovac – electric guitar
 Sarah Buxton – background vocals
 Perry Coleman – background vocals
 Vicki Hampton – background vocals
 Aubrey Haynie – fiddle
 Natalie Hemby – background vocals
 Mike Henderson – electric guitar
 Wes Hightower – background vocals
 Charlie Judge – synthesizer
 Troy Lancaster – electric guitar
 Ashley Monroe – vocals on "Lonely Tonight"
 Gordon Mote – Hammond B-3 organ, keyboards, piano
 Russ Pahl – pedal steel guitar
 RaeLynn – vocals on "Buzzin'"
 Blake Shelton – lead vocals
 Jimmie Lee Sloas – bass guitar
 Bryan Sutton – acoustic guitar, banjo
 Derek Wells – acoustic guitar, electric guitar
 Nir Z. – drums

Charts and certifications

Weekly charts

Year-end charts

Singles

Certifications

References

2014 albums
Blake Shelton albums
Warner Records albums
Albums produced by Scott Hendricks